Kalat (also Romanized as Kalāt; also known as Kalat al Abeid, Kalāt ol ‘Abīd, and Qala-āt al ‘Abaid) is a village in Bandar Charak Rural District, Shibkaveh District, Bandar Lengeh County, Hormozgan Province, Iran. At the 2006 census, its population was 85, in 15 families.

References 

Populated places in Bandar Lengeh County